Lola Leaves for the Ports (Spanish: La Lola se va a los puertos) is a 1947 Spanish historical musical drama film directed by Juan de Orduña and starring Juanita Reina, Nani Fernández and Manuel Luna. It is based on a 1929 play of the same title.

Synopsis
The action takes place in Andalusia in the 1860s. A carefree wandering female singer has many admirers in the coastal ports of the area. However, she falls deeply in love with a young man she meets.

Cast
 Juanita Reina as Lola  
 Nani Fernández as Rosario  
 Manuel Luna as Heredia  
 Ricardo Acero as José Luis 
 Jesús Tordesillas as Don Diego  
 Nicolás D. Perchicot as Willy  
 Faustino Bretaño as Asaúra  
 María Isbert as Criada  
 Rafaela Rodríguez as Criada  
 María Cañete as Mercedes  
 María Cuevas as Santera  
 Arturo Marín as Gitano  
 Fernando Aguirre as Hombre en isla  
 José María Mompín as Marinero 1  
 Joaquín Pujol as Marqués  
 Manuel Sabatini 
 Antonio Riquelme as Calamares  
 Conrado San Martín as Marinero 2  
 Casimiro Hurtado as Paco  
 Felipe Neri 
 Rafael Romero Marchent as Curro Mairén  
 Marina Torres as Enfermera  
 Teófilo Palou as Doctor  
 Manuel Dicenta as Panza Triste

References

Bibliography 
 Mira, Alberto. The Cinema of Spain and Portugal. Wallflower Press, 2005.

External links 
 

1940s historical musical films
Spanish historical musical films
1947 films
1940s Spanish-language films
Films directed by Juan de Orduña
Cifesa films
Films set in the 1860s
Films set in Andalusia
Films scored by Jesús García Leoz
Spanish films based on plays
Spanish black-and-white films
1940s Spanish films